Ricklingen is a borough and a quarter of Hanover, in Lower Saxony, and in Germany. The borough Ricklingen consists of the quarters Bornum, Mühlenberg, Oberricklingen, Ricklingen and Wettbergen.

It is the home of Rugby football sports club DRC Hannover which won the German rugby trophy in 2002, 2003 and 2006, and the Eurocup in 1999.

References

Boroughs and quarters of Hanover